Antonio Numai (died 1568) was a Roman Catholic prelate who served as Bishop of Isernia (1524–1567).

Biography
On 19 December 1524, Antonio Numai was appointed during the papacy of Pope Clement VII as Bishop of Isernia.
He served as Bishop of Isernia until his resignation in 1567. 
He died in 1568.

While bishop, he was the principal co-consecrator of Evangelista Cittadini, Bishop of Alessano (1544); and Giulio Giovio, Bishop of Nocera de' Pagani (1553).

References

External links and additional sources
 (for Chronology of Bishops) 
 (for Chronology of Bishops)  

16th-century Italian Roman Catholic bishops
Bishops appointed by Pope Clement VII
1568 deaths